Paramesia paracinctana is a species of moth of the family Tortricidae. It is found in Algeria.

References

	

Moths described in 1993
Archipini